Golden Summer, Eaglemont is an 1889 landscape painting by Australian artist Arthur Streeton. Painted en plein air at the height of a summer drought, it is an idyllic depiction of sunlit, undulating plains that stretch from Streeton's Eaglemont "artists' camp" to the distant blue Dandenong Ranges, outside Melbourne. Naturalistic yet poetic, and a conscious effort by the 21-year-old Streeton to create his grandest work yet, it is a prime example of the artist's distinctive, high-keyed blue and gold palette, what he considered "nature's scheme of colour in Australia".

The National Gallery of Australia acquired the painting in 1995 for $3.5 million, then a record price for an Australian painting. It remains one of Streeton's most famous works and is considered a masterpiece of Australian Impressionism.

Background

Streeton painted the work en plein air in January 1889 at his Eaglemont "artists' camp", located in the then-rural suburb of Heidelberg on Melbourne's outskirts. He passed through the area in late 1888 in search of the site depicted in one of his favourite paintings, Louis Buvelot's Summer Afternoon, Templestowe (1866). On his return journey, he met Charles Davis—brother-in-law of painter and friend David Davies—who granted him "artistic possession" of an old weatherboard homestead atop Mount Eagle. Streeton occupied the homestead over the next eighteen months; fellow plein airists Charles Conder and Tom Roberts joined him for extended periods, and less frequently other artists, notably Walter Withers.

Streeton described the location in a letter to Roberts, calling it "our hill of gold":

The title may have been inspired by young plein airist Leon Pole, one of the earliest members of the camp. In a letter to Roberts, Conder wrote affectionately of Pole, but said that he "sometimes drinks a little too much 'Golden Summer', as he calls wine". Years later, Streeton recalled painting Golden Summer as he, Conder, and plein airist John Ford Paterson shared cheese and a bottle of claret. John Sandes, a journalist who often visited the Eaglemont camp, wrote in 1927:

The painting is noted for its thick application of paint, and one evening in the Eaglemont homestead, Streeton approached the canvas with a knife in order to scrape away some of the layers. Roberts convinced him to "leave it alone", for which Streeton was later thankful.

Exhibition and reception

Table Talk reported in May 1889 that Golden Summer, Eaglemont "abundantly testifies to [Streeton's] perfect sense of colour ... He paints summer effects as if he loved the country." When the painting appeared at the Victorian Artists Society's 1889 winter show, leading critic James Smith, while opposed to what he called "the impressionist fad", said Golden Summer "is the best example of this class of work in the exhibition."

In April 1890, Arthur and Emma Minnie Boyd of the Boyd artistic dynasty took Golden Summer, Eaglemont to London, where, the following year as Golden Summer, Australia, it hung on the line at the Royal Academy, and in so doing became the first painting by an Australian-born artist to be exhibited there. In 1892, it appeared at the Paris Salon, initially receiving an honorable mention, and then a gold medal during a second appearance. One critic noted the popularity of Golden Summer with "the crowds that throng the Salon", saying that it was "simply impossible" to pass by the painting "as it is utterly different from any other picture in the vast collection". Likewise, Australian artist John Longstaff, then based in Paris, said the painting "created quite a sensation and stood out in oneness and quality all through everything else on the walls."

In 1898, Golden Summer appeared at the Exhibition of Australian Art in London, where an English critic opined that it was "produced by a painter who sees with his own eyes", and that "its composition of light and shade ... [is] perhaps its strongest quality."

Provenance
Soon after completing Golden Summer, Streeton offered it to Melbourne's National Gallery of Victoria for 100 guineas, but received no reply from the museum's trustees. Streeton sent them a second letter, writing sarcastically, "I should be obliged if you would convey to the Trustees my hearty thanks for the interest they have taken in the matter". Scottish shipbuilder Charles Mitchell purchased Golden Summer, Eaglemont on the opening day of the 1892 Paris Salon. It remained part of Mitchell's estate until Streeton re-acquired the painting from the shipbuilder's widow in 1919.

Ahead of its public auction in Australia in 1924, Lionel Lindsay extolled the work in the hope that it would enter a public gallery:

A private collector acquired it for 1,000 guineas, then a record for a painting by an Australian artist. Streeton used the money to commission an architect to design and build 'Longacres', a new house and studio in Olinda, outside Melbourne. Golden Summer broke the same sales record in 1995 when the National Gallery of Australia purchased it for $3.5 million. The record has been broken several times since, most recently in 2020 when Henri's Armchair (1974) by Brett Whiteley sold for over $6.1 million.

References

External links
 Golden Summer, Eaglemont at the National Gallery of Australia

Paintings by Arthur Streeton
1889 paintings
Collections of the National Gallery of Australia
Landscape paintings
Sheep in art